opened in Akita, Akita Prefecture, Japan in 1899, and it is the one of the oldest libraries in the country. The facilities reopened in a new building in 1993. The collection numbers some 805,000 items in 2012.

Gallery

See also
 List of libraries in Japan
 Akita Prefectural Museum

References

External links 
Official site

Location map

1899 establishments in Japan
Buildings and structures in Akita (city)
Libraries established in 1899
Libraries in Japan